So Dark  is a fictional supernatural horror/thriller series created and written by Al Loughe. The first season consisted of 7 episodes of 30 mins each, aired by Amazon in May 2017. The cast included Maria Olsen, Jeremy Palko, Keri Maletto (who was also joint producer alongside Al Lougher), Todd Bruno and Melanie Crimm. Julie Kendall and Wil Jackson also appeared.

Plot
The supernatural horror/thriller follows a hunt for a 200 year old vampire (played by Jeremy Palko) who escaped from police custody following his murder of a paedophile on the New York subway. The vampire follows a strict “code of ethics" selecting, trailing, hunting and feeding on bad people that have managed to avoid being caught by the law.

Cast
 Jeremy Palko as Sean the 200-year-old vampire.
Keri Maletto as FBI Agent Wilburn.
 Todd Bruno as Detective Russo.
Maria Olsen
 Julie Kendall
 Wil Jackson

References

2010s American horror television series
English-language television shows
American fantasy television series
American horror fiction television series
American action television series
2010s American drama television series
Horror drama television series
Serial drama television series
Vampires in television
Live action television shows based on films
American supernatural television series
American fantasy drama television series